The following is a list of programs broadcast by the French Polynesian channel Tahiti Nui Television. Its slogan is "La télé de chez nous".

Current emissions
50' inside l'actu
50' inside le mag
Automoto
Ça vous regarde
Chine actuelle
D&CO
E=M6
Enquête exclusive
État de santé
Grands Reportages
Harry Roselmack en immersion
Journal de 20 heures de TF1
L'empire des saveurs
Le Juste Prix
Les Reines du shopping
Ma Chine à moi
Maison à vendre
Noël avec Disney
Recherche appartement ou maison
Reportages
Téléfoot
The Voice, la plus belle voix
Tous ensemble
Vendredi, tout est permis avec Arthur
Zone interdite

Current series
24 heures chrono
Ahitea
Blue Bloods
Bones
Camping Paradis
Fairy Tail
Graceland
Hunter × Hunter (2011 version)
Joséphine, ange gardien
La Calle de las novias
Le Jour où tout a basculé
Le printemps de Xiaoju
Le règne de Kangxi
Le règne de Yongzheng
Les Feux de l'amour
Lucifer
Naruto: Shippuden
Pavitra Rishta
Peplum
Revenge
Rosario
Violetta

Current films
Battleship
Les gardiens de la galaxie
Le monde de Narnia chapitre III
Les Pingouins de Madagascar
Les Rois de la glisse
Nouveau départ
Star Wars Episode VII

Former programming
Les 12 Coups de Midi
Absolution - Heritage
Capital Magazine
Chapi Chapo
Ciné Nui
Dragon Ball Z
The Empire of Flavors
Eye for an Eye
Faati'a Mai
Fenua Foot
The Fires of Love
The Flash
Football
Great Return to Life
Heiiva i Tahiti
Hiro's
Horace and Tina
How to Get Away with Murder
La impostora
Islands Festival
It Looks At You
Kids TNTV
Kirby: Right Back at Ya!
LCI Log
Live Midi
Lotto Draw
Love Hina
Maison Ikkoku
Mana Culture
Manihini
Mutant X
My China to Me
The New Adventures of Lucky Luke
Nobody's Boy: Remi
Le Journal
One Child in the Arms
Opium and Guerilla: Welcome to Burma
Parenthood
Party of Five
Pirate Family
Pokémon
Portée disparue
Queens of Shopping
Rediffusion Newspapers
Research for the Benefit of Families
RoboCop
Star Academy
Story of a Work of Art
Taamotu
Ta'ata Tumu
Teenage Mutant Ninja Turtles
Te ve'a
'Telefilms
TNTV Sports
Together
To'u Fenua To'u Ora
Tupuna
Vaa Toa
Victoire Bonnot
Les Villaines
The Weekly Islands
Yu-Gi-Oh! Duel Monsters

References

Mass media in French Polynesia
Tahiti Nui Television